Messapia may refer to:

 The ancient region occupied by the extinct Messapii tribe
 The modern region of Salento, roughly equivalent to the ancient region
 Messapia, Greece